Jozef Palčák (born 17 December 1987) is a Slovak former professional cyclist, who rode professionally between 2014 and 2017 for the  and  teams.

Major results

2007
 5th Grand Prix Bradlo
 7th Overall Tour de Guadeloupe
2008
 1st Stage 7 Tour du Sénégal
 6th Overall Grand Prix Chantal Biya
2009
 10th Overall Grand Prix Chantal Biya
 10th Overall Tour du Faso
2010
 1st Stage 5 Tour du Cameroun
 1st Stage 3 Grand Prix Chantal Biya
2014
 8th Overall Grand Prix Chantal Biya
2016
 9th Overall Tour du Cameroun

References

External links

1987 births
Living people
Slovak male cyclists